Lance E. Nichols (born July 13, 1955) is an American actor best known for playing dentist Larry Williams on Treme.

Early life and education 
A native of New Orleans, Louisiana, Nichols graduated from McDonogh 35 College Preparatory Charter High School and the University of New Orleans.

Career 
Nichols is also known for his roles in The Curious Case of Benjamin Button and House of Cards and is a frequent presence in films that were made in the city.  In 2012 he appeared as a character similar to his Treme character, and also named "Larry", in a commercial for Chase Bank that also featured Drew Brees and his family and was aired during the broadcast of Super Bowl XLVI. From 2015 to 2019, he's starred in the martial arts drama series Into the Badlands, as a supporting character named The River King.

Filmography

Film

Television

References

External links

1955 births
Living people
American male film actors
21st-century American male actors
Male actors from New Orleans
University of New Orleans alumni
African-American male actors
21st-century African-American people
20th-century African-American people